Gregory Francis Thompson,  (March 28, 1947 – September 10, 2019) was a Canadian politician who served six terms as a Member of Parliament (MP), and for one term he represented the district of Saint Croix in the New Brunswick Legislative Assembly, from 2018 until 2019.

Political career 
Thompson was formerly a high school history teacher at Fundy High School from 1975–1980.

Thompson, a high school teacher, a businessman and financial planner was first elected to the House of Commons of Canada in the 1988 Canadian federal election as a member of the Progressive Conservative Party of Canada. He was elected in the riding of Carleton—Charlotte. His bid for re-election in the 1993 Canadian federal election was unsuccessful and he was defeated by Harold Culbert of the Liberal Party of Canada by fewer than 1,000 votes.

Thompson however ran again in the next election and was re-elected in the riding of Charlotte, where he defeated Culbert. Thompson was re-elected in the 2000 Canadian federal election in the riding of New Brunswick Southwest and again the 2004 Canadian federal election in the riding of St. Croix—Belleisle. Shortly before the 2004 election, he joined the new Conservative Party of Canada. He was re-elected in the 2006 federal election. In the 2008 federal election he was elected for a sixth term in the riding of New Brunswick Southwest by garnering over 58% of the vote.

During his time in parliament, he has served as the critic of Human Resources Development, the Treasury Board, Regional Development, Health, and Public Accounts, as well as critic of the Atlantic Canada Opportunities Agency. On February 6, 2006, he was appointed Minister of Veterans Affairs in Stephen Harper's Cabinet.  In April 2007, he and Harper told the press in Kitchener, Ontario that a Veterans' Bill of Rights would come into effect soon and there would be a new ombudsman for veterans along with it.

Thompson resigned from his position in Cabinet on January 16, 2010, because years of travel had worn him down and he wasn't looking forward to making a trip to New Zealand due to the length and time he had to invest in the trip. He also announced he would not run in the 2011 federal election.

Veterans Affairs privacy issues 

In October 2010, Canada's Privacy Commissioner Jennifer Stoddart uncovered evidence that widespread privacy abuses had been occurring at Veterans Affairs Canada.
Among the cases where privacy issues were investigated is that in which highly personal information of an outspoken critic of Veterans Affairs, including confidential medical and financial information, was included in briefing notes prepared for then-minister Greg Thompson.

Provincial politics
In 2018 Thompson ran provincially under the Progressive Conservatives in the riding of Saint Croix and won. He served as Minister of Intergovernmental Affairs until his death in September 2019.

Electoral record

See also
Veterans Affairs Canada

References

External links

1947 births
2019 deaths
Conservative Party of Canada MPs
Deaths from cancer in New Brunswick
Members of the 28th Canadian Ministry
Members of the Executive Council of New Brunswick
Members of the House of Commons of Canada from New Brunswick
Members of the King's Privy Council for Canada
People from St. Stephen, New Brunswick
Progressive Conservative Party of New Brunswick MLAs
St. Thomas University (New Brunswick) alumni